Costa Rica competed in the 2019 Pan American Games in Lima, Peru from July 26 to August 11, 2019.

On 11 July 2019, the Costa Rican Olympic Committee officially named a team of 85 athletes (44 women and 41 men) competing in 24 sports. 

During the opening ceremony of the games, footballer Shirley Cruz carried the flag of the country as part of the parade of nations.

At this edition of the games, Costa Rica won five medals, the second best performance for the country at a single edition of the games (the best performance being the 11 medals won in 1987).

Competitors
The following is the list of number of competitors (per gender) participating at the games per sport/discipline.

Medalists
The following competitors from Costa Rica won medals at the games. In the by discipline sections below, medalists' names are bolded.

|  style="text-align:left; vertical-align:top;"|

|  style="text-align:left; width:22%; vertical-align:top;"|

Athletics (track and field)

Costa Rica qualified eight athletes (four men and four women).

Key
Note–Ranks given for track events are for the entire round
Q = Qualified for the next round directly

Men
Track events

Field event

Women
Track and Road Events

Badminton

Costa Rica qualified a team of two badminton athletes (one per gender).

Beach volleyball

Costa Rica qualified four beach volleyball athletes (two men and two women).
Men

Women

Bodybuilding

Costa Rica qualified one male bodybuilder.

Men

No results were provided for the prejudging round, with only the top six advancing.

Bowling

Boxing

Costa Rica qualified two boxers (one man and one woman).

Canoeing

Slalom
Costa Rica qualified one male slalom athlete.

Key
Note–Ranks given are within the heat
Men

Bowling

Cycling

Costa Rica qualified seven cyclists (five men and two women).

BMX
Men
Freestyle

Racing

Mountain biking

Road cycling
Men

Equestrian

Costa Rica qualified two equestrians.

Dressage

Fencing

Costa Rica qualified a 1 female fencer in the épée discipline.

Women

Football

Costa Rica qualified a women's team (of 18 athletes).

Women's tournament

Roster
The following players were called up for the 2019 Pan American Games.

Head coach: Amelia Valverde

Semifinals

Bronze medal match

Golf

Costa Rica qualified two male golfers.

Men

Gymnastics

Costa Rica qualified four artistic gymnasts (two men and two women).

Artistic
Men
2 quotas

Women
2 quotas

Judo

Costa Rica qualified one female judoka.

Women

Karate

Costa Rica qualified four athletes in the kata discipline (one man and three women).

Kata

Racquetball

Costa Rica qualified three racquetball athletes (two men and one woman).

Roller sports

Costa Rica qualified two men in the speed discipline.

Speed
Men

*Position is giving within the heat for the 500 m event

Shooting

Costa Rica qualified two male shooters in the rifle discipline.

Men

Surfing

Costa Rica qualified four surfers (three men and one woman) in the sport's debut at the Pan American Games.

Artistic

Race

Taekwondo

Costa Rica qualified four taekwondo practitioners (two per gender).

Kyorugi

Triathlon

Costa Rica qualified one female triathlete.

Men

Weightlifting

Costa Rica qualified four weightlifters (two men and two women). However, only three were entered (two men and one woman).

Wrestling

Costa Rica qualified one male in the freestyle discipline.

Men's freestyle

See also
Costa Rica at the 2020 Summer Olympics

References

Nations at the 2019 Pan American Games
2019
2019 in Costa Rican sport